The smallnose fanskate (Sympterygia bonapartii) is a species of fish in the family Arhynchobatidae. It is found off the coasts of Argentina, Brazil, Chile, and Uruguay. Its natural habitats are open seas, shallow seas, and estuarine waters.

Sources

Sympterygia
Fish described in 1841
Taxonomy articles created by Polbot